Disney Super Guitar (also known as Super Guitar Disney in Japan) is an American rock band who specialized in instrumental covers of theme songs from Disney films.

Band Personnel
Keyboards = Michael Vescera (Obsession, ex-Yngwie Malmsteen, ex-Loudness, etc..)
Bass = Chris Vescera (Michael Vescera's brother)
Rhythm guitar = John Bruno (Obsession, Michael Vescera, and X Factor X)
Drums = BJ Zampa (House of Lords, ex-Yngwie Malmsteen, ex-Obsession, and ex-Dokken)

Disney Super Guitar album
The eponymous album was recorded in 2018 by much of the same team that created D-Metal Stars' Metal Disney, with Michael Vescera (keyboards, arrangement, production), John Bruno (rhythm guitar), BJ Zampa (drums), and Chris Vescera (bass).

The Disney Super Guitar album was engineered by Michael Vescera and mixed by Mike Farona at Musimusic Nashville.Mastering was done by Dave Collins, who has previously worked on Metallica's Hardwired... to Self-Destruct and the Jurassic Park OST.

In April 2018, Super Guitar Disney became a #1 Best Seller on "Amazon Anime Music Best Sellers" chart in Japan.

Highest chart positions
April 2018
 #14 "Amazon Rock Music Best Sellers"
 #67 "Amazon Best Selling Albums"
 #85 "iTunes Top 100 Albums"

April 2018 (Japan Release - Super Guitar Disney)
 #1 "Amazon Anime Music Best Sellers"
 #3 “Amazon Rock Music Best Sellers”
 #49 "Amazon Best Selling Albums"
 #35 "iTunes Top 100 Albums - Japan"

Track listing

References 

 "Loudwire"
 "Blabbermouth"
 "Alternative Press"
 "Guitar World"
 "Guitar Player"

American instrumental musical groups
American hard rock musical groups
American heavy metal musical groups
Walt Disney Records artists